is a passenger railway station located in the Nishitosaekawasaki neighborhood of the city of Shimanto, Kōchi Prefecture, Japan. It is operated by JR Shikoku and has the station number "G34".

Lines

Layout
The station consists of an island platform serving two tracks. A paved concrete path leads from the platform across one track to a station building which serves as a waiting room. There was originally a JR Shikoku operated ticket counter but this was closed in 2010. Subsequently, Ekawasaki became a Kan'i itaku station. A tourist information centre with a restaurant and shop is located next to the station building. Nearby is a bike shed. Parking for cars is available on the forecourt of the station.

Adjacent stations

|-
!colspan=5|JR Shikoku

History
The station opened on 26 March 1953 under the control of Japanese National Railways. After the privatization of JNR on 1 April 1987, control of the station passed to JR Shikoku.

Surrounding area
Shimanto Furusato Information Cente
Shimanto River
Japan National Route 381
Japan National Route 441

See also
 List of railway stations in Japan

References

External links
Station timetable

Railway stations in Kōchi Prefecture
Yodo Line
Railway stations in Japan opened in 1953
Shimanto, Kōchi (city)